Paul Büchel (born 18 January 1953) is a Liechtenstein judoka. He competed in the men's half-heavyweight event at the 1976 Summer Olympics.

References

1953 births
Living people
Liechtenstein male judoka
Olympic judoka of Liechtenstein
Judoka at the 1976 Summer Olympics
Place of birth missing (living people)